Year 1035 (MXXXV) was a common year starting on Wednesday (link will display the full calendar) of the Julian calendar.

Events 
 By place 

 Europe 
 c. July 3 – 8-year-old William I becomes duke of Normandy after his father Robert I ("the Magnificent") dies on a pilgrimage at Nicaea (modern Turkey). Robert's death leads to a period of instability in Normandy, as William is too young to take his father's place. The Norman nobles in the region take the opportunity to settle old feuds and to increase their private wealth.
 October 16 – Conrad II grants the right to hold the first Freimarkt festival in Bremen. The city increases her trade with Norway, and the northern Netherlands. 
 October 18 – King Sancho III of Pamplona dies and divides his dominions among his four sons, García Sánchez III, Gonzalo I, Ferdinand I and Ramiro I.
 Pisa launches a naval assault against Saracen pirate strongholds in the Lipari Islands.
 Emperor Conrad II ("the Elder") grants the city of Koper (modern Slovenia) town rights, and some degree of self-government, within the Holy Roman Empire.

 England 
 November 12 – King Cnut the Great dies at Shaftesbury, leaving the rule of England in dispute between his sons Harthacnut and Harold Harefoot. The earls of Northumbria and Mercia support Harold's claim, while Godwin (Earl of Wessex) supports Harthacnut. Harold is elected as regent (or joint ruler) of England. Cnut is buried in the Old Minster, in Winchester.
 Winter – Harthacnut is unable to travel to his coronation in England because his Danish kingdom is under threat of an invasion by King Magnus I of Norway and King Anund Jacob of Sweden.

Births 
 Dharma Pala, Indian ruler of the Pala dynasty (d. 1060)
 Richard fitz Gilbert, Norman nobleman (d. c.1090) (approximate date)
 Henry of Burgundy, French nobleman (approximate date)
 Hereward the Wake, English nobleman (approximate date)
 Hermann of Salm, German nobleman (approximate date)
 Isaac Albalia, Andalusian Jewish astronomer (d. 1094)
 Leofwine Godwinson, English nobleman (approximate date)
 Marbodius of Rennes, French archdeacon (approximate date)
 Nathan ben Jehiel, Italian Jewish lexicographer (d. 1106)
 Robert I, the Frisian, count of Flanders (approximate date)
 Urban II, pope of the Catholic Church (approximate date)

Deaths 
 April 13 – Herbert I, French nobleman (approximate date)
 May 26 – Berenguer Ramon I, Spanish nobleman (b. 1005)
 May 30 – Baldwin IV ("the Bearded"), French nobleman (b. 980)
 July 3 – Robert I ("the Magnificent"), duke of Normandy (b. 1000) (approximate date)
 October 18 – Sancho III ("the Great"), king of Pamplona
 November 4 – Jaromír, duke of Bohemia (Přemyslid dynasty)
 November 12 – Cnut, king of Denmark, Norway and England
 Abu Ali ibn Muhammad, ruler (malik) of the Ghurid dynasty
 Astrid Olofsdotter, queen consort of Norway (House of Munsö)
 Drogo of Mantes, count of Valois and the Vexin (b. 996)
 Estrid of the Obotrites (or Astrid), queen consort of Sweden
 Guo, Chinese empress consort of Renzong (b. 1012)
 Harun, Ghaznavid governor and ruler (shah) of Khwarazm, assassinated
 Ibn al-Samh, Moorish astronomer and mathematician (b. 979)
 Svein Knutsson, king of Norway and son of Cnut the Great
 Yahya ibn Ali ibn Hammud al-Mu'tali, Hammudid caliph

References